The Ministry of Finance of the Czech Republic, abbreviated MFČR, is a government ministry, responsible for matters relating to economic policy, the government budget, revenue service, banking, security and insurance, international economic work, central, regional and local government.

The Ministry is administrated by the Finance Minister, who is member of the Cabinet. Since 17 December 2021 the minister is Zbyněk Stanjura.

See also
Finance Minister of the Czech Republic

External links

References

Czech Republic
Finance
Ministries established in 1969
1969 establishments in Czechoslovakia